Bayou Pierre is a river in Louisiana and Mississippi, United States. It is a tributary of the Mississippi River merging just downstream from the town of St. Joseph, Louisiana on the opposite bank.

Geography and location 
Bayou Pierre is the location of the present day city of Port Gibson, Mississippi. It was the site many of the earliest Protestant settlers disembarked the Mississippi River. Located about 30 miles north of Natchez, the towns were connected by the first road built in the Mississippi territory, the Natchez trace, in 1801–02. Settlers floated the Tennessee, Ohio, and Mississippi rivers in the early 1800s to get to the new territory because there were no roads except this short section of the Natchez trace.

References

Rivers of Louisiana
Rivers of Mississippi
Tributaries of the Mississippi River